Kabin United Football Club is a Thai football club based in Kabin Buri, Prachinburi Province. The club is currently playing in the Thai League 3 Eastern region.

Stadium and locations

Season by season record

Players

Current squad

References

External links
 Facebookpage

 

Association football clubs established in 2013
Football clubs in Thailand
Prachinburi province
2013 establishments in Thailand